Meleh Har (also Romanized as Meleh Hār; also known as Meleh Hār-e Dīzgarān, and Meleh Hāy-ye Dīzgarān) is a village in Harasam Rural District, Homeyl District, Eslamabad-e Gharb County, Kermanshah Province, Iran. At the 2006 census, its population was 450, in 100 families.

References 

Populated places in Eslamabad-e Gharb County